Ispahdost or Isfahdust, was a Daylamite military officer who served the Buyid dynasty. He first appears as an officer of the Buyid ruler Mu'izz al-Dawla during his conquest of Abbasid Iraq in 945. Furthermore, Ispahdost is later mentioned as the brother-in-law of Mu'izz al-Dawla, and one year later, participated in the defense of Baghdad against the Hamdanids. In 948, Ispahdost, along with the Abbasid caliph al-Muti, planned a plot against Mu'izz al-Dawla, which, however, Mu'izz al-Dawla became informed of, and had Ispahdost imprisoned, who soon died.

Sources 
 
 

Buyid generals
Daylamites
948 deaths
10th-century Iranian people
Year of birth unknown
Prisoners and detainees of the Buyid dynasty